In research ethics, justice is the fair selection of research participants. Justice is the ideal distribution of risks and benefits when scientists conducting clinical research are recruiting volunteer research participants to participate in clinical trials. The concept gives guidelines on how scientific objectives and not membership in either a privileged or vulnerable population should determine which members of which communities should meet inclusion criteria to participate in research in order to most equitably share the risks and benefits of the research.

Defining research justice
The most commonly recognized source for drawing attention to the importance of justice is the Belmont Report,  which used the term "justice" to describe a set of guidelines for the selection of research subjects. This is a critical safeguard to making clinical research ethical.

References

External links
the Belmont Report, a United States guideline

Medical ethics
Human subject research
Justice
Ethical principles